Rajiv Smruthi Bhavan is a memorial and cultural center at Beach road, Pandurangapuram, Visakhapatnam. It was established in the year 2008 by the then Chief Minister of Andhra Pradesh Y. S. Rajasekhara Reddy.

About
This memorial and cultural center is dedicated to the former Prime Minister of India Rajiv Gandhi. This venue is permanent photo exhibition of Rajiv Gandhi  and is also a center for classical and carnatic music.

References

External links

Museums in Visakhapatnam
Cultural heritage of India
Heritage centre
2008 establishments in Andhra Pradesh
Museums established in 2008